The Possibility and the Promise is the first full-length album released by the emo band Amber Pacific. The title was taken from a quote in Charles Bukowski's Ham on Rye. The album contains one previously heard track, which is "Always You (Good Times)", which can be heard on the band's debut EP.
The song is also featured on the soundtrack of Criterion Games Burnout 3: Takedown.

Track listing

Deluxe Edition
In addition to the above songs, the Deluxe Edition contained the following songs:

Personnel

Amber Pacific
 Matt Young – vocals
 Will Nutter – guitar, backup vocals, piano, keyboard
 Greg Strong – bass
 Justin Westcott – guitar, backup vocals
 Dango – drums

Additional musicians
 Christine Dunaway – violin, viola (on "Everything We Were Has Become What We Are" and "For What It's Worth")
 Douglas Aaron Nation – cello (on "Everything We Were Has Become What We Are" and "For What It's Worth")
 Davy Rispoli – backup vocals

References

2005 debut albums
Amber Pacific albums
Albums produced by Martin Feveyear
Hopeless Records albums